Idit Keidar is a professor of electrical engineering and an author of more than 180 articles which gave her an h-index of 38 and were cited more than 5,000 times. Some of them were published in such journals as Journal of Parallel and Distributed Computing and SIAM Journal on Computing.

References

Living people
20th-century births
Israeli engineers
Academic staff of Technion – Israel Institute of Technology
Date of birth missing (living people)
Hebrew University of Jerusalem alumni
Israeli women engineers
21st-century women engineers
Year of birth missing (living people)